The Orto Botanico Conservativo Carlo Spegazzini (1500 m2), also called the Giardino Conservativo Spegazzini, is a botanical garden operated by the Accademia Trevigiana per il Territorio, and located at viale de Coubertin 15, Treviso, Veneto, Italy. It is open daily.

The garden was established in 1995, and named in honor of local botanist Carlo Spegazzini, with a mission to preserve native species, crops, and environments for experimental study. It currently contains over 500 plants representing about 30 species, organized into the following zones: a hedge; collection of Prunus species; traditional vines and mulberry trees; and two ponds.

See also 
 List of botanical gardens in Italy

References 
 Orto Botanico Conservativo Carlo Spegazzini
 Comune di Treviso description (Italian)
 Horti entry (Italian)

Botanical gardens in Italy
Gardens in Veneto
Treviso